Abdelmalek Sayad (November 24, 1933, in Beni Djellil, Algeria – March 13, 1998, in Paris, France), was a sociologist, first as an assistant to Pierre Bourdieu, then as a research director at the French CNRS and at the School for Advanced Studies in the Social Sciences. An expert of the North-African community in France,  he was central to the introduction of the study of migration issues in French social sciences.

Life and career 
Abdelmalek Sayad was born in 1933 in Aghbala, in the Beni Djellil commune in Kabylie, a Berber region in Northern Algeria. The third child and only boy of a family of five children, he started attending his village's primary school at seven. He then went on to study to Béjaïa's highschool, before training to be a primary school teacher in Algiers. He was then appointed a teacher in a school in the Casbah of Algiers. He continued studying at Algiers university in parallel, where he met Pierre Bourdieu.

Sayad moved to France in 1963, after the Algerian independence in 1962. He started working on short-term contracts at the Centre de sociologie européenne at the School for Advanced Studies in the Social Sciences. In 1977, he was hired at the Centre national de la recherche scientifique (CNRS), as research director in sociology.

Sayad died on March 13, 1998.

He was married to Rebecca Sayad, who donated his archive to the Cité nationale de l'histoire de l'immigration (Paris) in 2006. The library of this museum is named after him. 

The Association of the friends of Abdelmalek Sayad has organised events surrounding his thought, and contributed to make his work known in France and in Algeria, via an exhibition, conferences and workshops.

Sociology 
Sayad renewed the approach of French sociology on immigration, which he was looking at through a double prism. In order to study immigration, he argued that it was a "total social fact", using Marcel Mauss's expression to underline that the immigrant was also an emigrant. He placed the emigrant-immigrant at the heart of the analysis, and argued against analyses which were limited to comparing the economic 'costs' and 'benefits' of immigration.

This led him to pay specific attention to history, by looking at the effect of colonisation in Algeria and of the war of independence, as is apparent in his work with Pierre Bourdieu Le Déracinement. La crise de l'agriculture traditionnelle en Algérie (The Uprooting: The Crisis of Traditional Agriculture in Algeria).

In France, Sayad  examined the difficult situation of migrants arriving in a new country, forgotten in both their origin and their host countries, forced into silence. The most important articles he wrote on the subject were published after his death in a book entitled La double absence (The double absence), with a foreword by Pierre Bourdieu. The book was translated by David Macey as « The Suffering of the immigrant ». The book shows how the migration process is a personal and spiritual experience of suffering, which affects the collective aspects of emigration.

Bibliography 
 The suffering of  the immigrant, Cambridge, Polity Press, 2004. Translated by David Macey. 
 La double absence. Des illusions de l'émigré aux souffrances de l'immigré. Paris, Seuil, 1999, 438 p. Coll. Liber.
 Avec Pierre Bourdieu, Le déracinement : La crise de l'agriculture traditionnelle en Algérie, Paris, Les Éditions de Minuit, 1964
 L'immigration, ou les paradoxes de l'altérité, De Boeck Université, 1992, 331 p.
 Un Nanterre algérien, terre de bidonvilles (avec Éliane Dupuy), Autrement, 1998, 125 p.
 Avec Alain Gillette, L'immigration algérienne en France, Paris, Éditions Entente, 1976, 127 pages (sous le pseudonyme Malek Ath-Messaoud), 2de édition, 1998, 279 pages (sans pseudonyme)
 Histoire et recherche identitaire suivi de Entretien avec Hassan Arfaoui, Bouchène, 2002, 113 p.
 La doppia assenza. Dalle illusioni dell'emigrato alle sofferenze dell'immigrato, trad. : D. Borca et R. Kirchmayr, éd. Cortina Raffaello, 2002.
 Algeria: nazionalismo senza nazione, éd. Mesogea, 2003. 
 L'immigration ou les paradoxes de l'altérité. 1. L'illusion du provisoire, Paris, Éditions Raisons d'agir, 2006, 218 p.
 L'immigration ou les paradoxes de l'altérité. 2. Les enfants illégitimes, Paris, Éditions Raisons d'agir, 2006, 208 p.
 L'immigration ou les paradoxes de l'altérité. 3. La fabrication des identités culturelles, Paris, Éditions Raisons d'agir, 2014, 205 p. Préface d'Amin Pérez
  L'immigrazione o i paradossi dell'alterità. L'illusione del provvisorio, trad. S. Ottaviani, éd. Ombre Corte, 2008.
   L'école et les enfants de l'immigration, essais critiques, Paris, Seuil, La couleur des idées, 2014,239p., Edition établie, présentée et annotée par Benoit Falaize et Smaïn Laacher.

References 

Academic staff of the School for Advanced Studies in the Social Sciences
1933 births
Kabyle people
Algerian sociologists
Algerian writers
20th-century French non-fiction writers
University of Algiers alumni
1998 deaths